The Guangzhou International Women's Open is a tennis tournament held in Guangzhou, People's Republic of China. Held since 2004, the inaugural tournament had Li Na as the first ever Chinese singles title winner.

Past finals

Singles

Doubles

External links
WTA Tour profile

 
Tennis tournaments in China
Hard court tennis tournaments
WTA Tour
Sports competitions in Guangzhou
Recurring sporting events established in 2004